Waldlaubersheim is a municipality in the district of Bad Kreuznach in Rhineland-Palatinate, in western Germany. As of the census of population in 2020 it had a total population of 801. Waldlaubersheim's postal code is 55444.

Geography and climate
Waldlaubersheim is located at (49.930556°, 7.832778°).It is located in the Hunsrück area. The Elevation is approximately 250 meters above sea level, which is much higher than either Bad Kreuznach or Mainz, due to its location at the southern end of the Hunsrück geological mountain range. Avarage temperature is 9° Celsius.

Demographics
The Census of 2020 reported that Waldlaubersheim had a population of 801. The population density was 99,5 people per square kilometer. The sexual makeup of Waldlaubersheim was 405 (50,6%) women and 396 men (49,4%). The national makeup was 750 (93,6%) Germans and  51 (6,4%) Foreigners.

The population was spread out, with 131 people (16,4%) under the age of 20, 106 people (13,2%) aged 20 to 34, 175 people (21.8%) aged 35 to 49, 200 people (25,0%) aged 50 to 64, and 198 people (23,6%) who were 65 years of age or older.

Economy
Waldlaubersheim's economy is based on warehouse services. The town is frequently used as a stop for food and fuel by drivers on Bundesautobahn 61 between the Netherlands and Switzerland. It is the last town for those traveling on L236 north to Stromberg (Hunsrück) or south to Bad Kreuznach.

References

Bad Kreuznach (district)